Saint Ephraim of Katounakia or Efrem/Ephraim Katounakiotis (born Evangelos Papanikitas in Abelochori, 6 December 1912 – Mount Athos, 27 February 1998) was an Orthodox monk who lived on Mount Athos. He was canonized as a saint by the Ecumenical Patriarchate of Constantinople on 9 March 2020. His feast is commemorated on February 27.

Early life
He was born into a peasant family on 6 December 1912 in Abelochori (Αμπελοχώρι), a village in Thebes, Boeotia. His father's name was Ioannis Papanikitas (Ιωάννης Παπανικήτας) and his mother's name was Victoria (Βικτωρία). He had had 3 siblings, namely Epaminondas (Ἐπαμεινώνδα), Eleni (Ἑλένη), and Charalambos (Χαράλαμπο). His secular name was Evangelos. He spent his childhood in Abelochori. However, while he was in primary school, his parents moved to Thebes for their children's education. He became interested in monasticism from an early age.

However, he suffered health problems as a child and developed lumps around his eyes at the age of 14. He also later developed a severe eczematous condition in the ankle joint.

Monastic life
On September 14, 1933, Evangelos decided to become a monk and went to Katounakia at the southern tip of Mount Athos, also known as the "desert of Mount Athos". In Katounakia, he lived at the hermitage of Saint Ephrem the Syrian and was accompanied by his family acquaintances Ephraim and Nikephoros. Six months after his enlistment, he became a junior monk and received the name Longinus. In 1935, he was ordained a monk by his Elder Nikephoros and received the name Ephraim. The following year he was ordained a priest.

Father Ephraim met the famous Elder Joseph the Hesychast (1898–1959) and became his spiritual follower after receiving permission from Elder Nikephoros. Elder Joseph, in turn, exerted a catalytic influence on the young monk's spirituality.

In 1973, Hieromonk Nikephoros died. Ephraim formed a group of disciples after 1980, following Elder Joseph's instruction to have a group of disciples after the death of Nikephoros.

His nickname on Mount Athos was "the Charismatic Submissive" because of the obedience he showed to Elder Nikephoros, who was often very harsh.

In 1996, Ephraim suffered a stroke and was immobilized. He died on 27 February 1998 (Julian calendar date: 14 February 1998) and was buried on the land of his cell, in a grave he had dug himself with his own hands.

Canonization
On 20 October 2019, at the Protaton Church in Karyes on Mt. Athos, Ecumenical Patriarch Bartholomew announced the beatification of four great 20th-century Athonite elders, including:

 Daniel of Katounakia (died 1929)
  (died 1957)
 Joseph the Hesychast (died 1959) 
 Ephraim of Katounakia (died 1998)

He was canonized as a saint on 9 March 2020, along with the three other monks listed above.

Further reading

References

External links
 Resources on Ephraim Katounakiotis
 Documentary film, Όσιος Εφραίμ Κατουνακιώτης 

1912 births
1998 deaths
20th-century Christian saints
20th-century Christian mystics
Christian ascetics
Athonite Fathers
Eastern Orthodox mystics
Eastern Orthodox monks
Greek saints of the Eastern Orthodox Church
Hesychasts
Disciples of Joseph the Hesychast